Natural History is an album by J. D. Souther, released in 2011. It includes new recordings of some of his best known songs, many most prominently recorded by other artists; "Best of My Love" and "New Kid in Town" by the Eagles, "Faithless Love" and "Prisoner in Disguise" by Linda Ronstadt. The arrangements are spare featuring acoustic guitar and piano.

Track listing 
All songs written by J. D. Souther, except where noted.
"Go Ahead and Rain" – 3:29
"Faithless Love" – 4:07
"You're Only Lonely" – 4:07
"The Sad Cafe" (Don Henley, Glenn Frey, Joe Walsh, Souther) – 4:50
"Silver Blue" – 3:57
"New Kid in Town" (Henley, Frey, Souther) – 5:26
"I'll Take Care of You" – 2:25
"Little Victories" – 4:37
"Prisoner in Disguise" – 3:47
"Best of My Love" (Henley, Frey, Souther) – 4:34
"I'll Be Here at Closing Time" – 3:50
"How Long" - 3:27 (bonus track for Japan)
"Heartache Tonight" - 3:45 (bonus track for Japan)

Personnel
J. D. Souther – vocals, acoustic and electric guitar
Chris Walters – piano
John Hobbs – piano
Bryan Sutton – acoustic and electric guitar
Jim White – drums, percussion
Viktor Krauss – upright bass
Jerry Douglas – dobro
Charlie McCoy – vibes
Jeff Coffin – soprano and tenor saxophone
Rod McGaha – trumpet
John Jorgenson – clarinet, nylon string and electric guitar

Production notes
Fred Mollin – producer
Casey Wood, Dave Salley – engineer
Kyle Lehning – mixer
Alan Silverman – mastering

References

2011 albums
J. D. Souther albums